Walk a Mile in My Pradas is a 2011 American gay body-switching romantic comedy film directed by Joey Sylvester.

A magic Christmas ornament turns two men's lives upside down when homophobic Tony starts preferring men two weeks before his wedding and his gay co-worker Steve finds himself blossoming into a ladies' man.

It was filmed in locations such as Hollywood and Silver Lake, Los Angeles, California.

It was Nathaniel Marston's final film, before he was involved in a car crash that led to his death.

Plot
On a new jobsite, homophobic construction worker Tony (Nathaniel Marston) and a gay co-worker Steve, (Tom Archdeacon) meet and instantly hate each other. With Tony making life on the site unbearable for Steve. Then at a party, both wishes that the other would switch lifestyles, a magical Christmas tree angel glows. Later, the two find a transformation has taken place. Tony begins acting strange he starts to like cooking and also cruising guys in Gay bars, while Steve, to the dismay of lover Michael (Emrhys Cooper), begins to check out and fancy girls. Tony finds that his gay intolerance is due to his Italian Catholic parents (Dee Wallace, Mike Starr) and his school teacher Sister Betty (Bunny Levine). Both try to fix things to return to normal before the wedding of Tony.

Cast

Reception
Richard Propes from theindependentcritic.com gave the film B+ or 3.5 stars out of 5 rating. He also notes "script that is filled with terrific one-liners" and it is a "terrific example of the independent spirit of Hollywood". Don Grigware called it the "perfect holiday fare. It's breezy and uplifting". Andy Goulding on 30 November 2012, reviewed the DVD and gave it 1/2 a star out of 5 and noted "one of the worst films I’ve ever seen and that’s not even touching on the acting, which ranges from barely adequate to abominable", "The script is totally devoid of any sort of wit or charm and even its more dramatic character scenes are flimsy". While David Hall from www.gaycelluloid.com states "given all too many jokes are at the expense of stereotype" and "whilst ever preaching the message of gay rights. And frankly, that's a message well worth repeating".

Walk a Mile in My Pradas was a winner in the 2011 Hoboken International Film Festival for Best Trailer and Best Supporting Actor Tom Archdeacon.

The DVD was released on 15 November 2011 on Region 1 (in U.S. and Canada only). The DVD was also released on the Breaking Glass UK catalogue on 28 January 2013.

References

External links
 
 

2011 LGBT-related films
2011 films
American independent films
American comedy films
Films shot in Los Angeles
Films shot in Los Angeles County, California
2010s English-language films
LGBT-related comedy films
2011 independent films
2010s American films